The Lort Burn is a subterranean burn in Newcastle upon Tyne.  It used to flow through the centre of the city into the Tyne but was essentially used as an open sewer, particularly unpleasant since the meat markets backed onto it. The name may derive from the Old Norse 'lortr' meaning 'filth' or 'excrement'. In 1696 it was put underground, and in 1749 Dean Street was built following its course (hence the street name, from dene); as was its extension, Grey Street, in the 1830s.  

The burn starts in Leazes Park.

 

Geography of Newcastle upon Tyne